Bernard D. Bull (born 1971) is an American academic administrator and scholar. He is currently serving as president of Concordia University Nebraska. Bull previously served as president of Goddard College in Plainfield, Vermont.

Biography 
After serving for twelve years in Lutheran middle and high schools in Illinois and Wisconsin, Bull began his higher education career in 2006 at Concordia University Wisconsin, serving as a professor of education, Chief Innovation Officer, and Vice Provost of Curriculum and Academic Innovation.

In 2012, he was named a Thrivent Fellow, a fellowship dedicated to equipping current and emerging higher education leaders. That same year, he was granted the Wagner Distance Education Award.

In 2016, Bull became the Jonathan D. Harber Fellow in Education and Entrepreneurship at Wesleyan University in Middletown, Connecticut, where he taught Social Entrepreneurship in Education and during which he completed the manuscript for Adventures in Self-Directed Learning.

In 2018, Bull became president of Goddard College, a low-residency alternative and experimental college. Bull accepted the job months after it was placed on probation by the New England Commission of Higher Education over concerns regarding institutional resources and organization and governance, with growing questions about whether the college would survive. In September, 2020, Goddard was removed from probation and its accreditation was renewed.

On December 1, 2020, Concordia University Nebraska announced Bull as the president-elect, scheduled to transition from Goddard College to Concordia University Nebraska in August 2021.

Bull's writing and scholarship focuses on educational innovation, contemporary issues in education, futures in education, and religious education.

Education 
Bull attended Metro East Lutheran High School in Edwardsville, Illinois. He went on to earn a Bachelor of Arts in history and education from Concordia University Wisconsin in 1993. He completed a Master of Arts in Curriculum and Instruction from Concordia University Chicago, a Master of Liberal Studies from the University of Wisconsin-Milwaukee, and a Doctorate of Education in instructional technology from Northern Illinois University.

Bibliography

As author 

 Missional Moonshots: Insight and Inspiration in Educational Innovation. Greenwood, WI: Athanatos Publishing Group, 2016.
 What Really Matters?: Ten Critical Issues in Contemporary Education. Eugene, OR: Wipf and Stock, 2016.
 Adventures in Self-Directed Learning: A Guide for Nurturing Learner Agency and Ownership. Eugene, OR: Wipf and Stock, 2017.
 Digitized: Spiritual Implications of Technology. St. Louis: MO: Concordia Publishing House, 2018.
 Imagine the Possibilities: Conversations on the Future of Christian Education with James Pingel. St. Louis: MO: Concordia Publishing House, 2018.
 Prep Talks: Tales of Challenges & Opportunities in Christian Education with James Pingel and Michael Uden. St. Louis: MO: Concordia Publishing House, 2019.
 Breathe: A Vision & Framework for Human-Centered Learning Environments. Mequon, WI: Birdhouse Learning Labs, 2020.

As editor 

 The Pedagogy of Faith: Essays on Lutheran Education. St. Louis: MO: Concordia Publishing House, 2016.

As contributor 

Entries on andragogy, connectivism, constructivism, discipleship in the digital age, gaming, heutagogy, and pedagogy. Encyclopedia of Christian Education (edited by George T. Kurian and Mark A. Lamport). Lanham, Maryland: Rowman and Littlefield, 2015.
Entries on virtual high schools, digital badges, cyberculture, charter schools, alternative assessment, the credit hour, and homeschooling. The Sage Encyclopedia of Online Learning (edited by Steven L. Danver). Los Angeles, CA: Sage Publications, 2016.
"Embracing Opportunities for Self-Directed Learning in Formal Learning Organizations." In Experiences in Self-Determined Learning (edited by L.M. Blaschke, C. Kenyon, and S. Hase). Sydney: Bloomsbury Academics, 2014.

References 

 

Heads of universities and colleges in the United States
Northern Illinois University alumni
University of Wisconsin–Milwaukee alumni
Concordia University Chicago alumni
Concordia University Wisconsin alumni
American Lutherans
Living people

1971 births